Liglet is a commune in the Vienne department in the Nouvelle-Aquitaine region in western France.

Geography
The river Benaize forms part of the commune's southern border, flows north through the commune, then forms part of the commune's northern border.

Population

See also
Communes of the Vienne department

References

Communes of Vienne